The Ink and Paint Club is an hour-long television series on Disney Channel in 1997, featuring various Disney animated shorts, as part of Vault Disney. Episodes usually consisted of six or seven cartoon shorts, with a linking theme.

Episodes

External links
 

1990s American animated television series
1990s American anthology television series
1997 American television series debuts
1998 American television series endings
American children's animated anthology television series
Disney animated television series
Disney Channel original programming
English-language television shows
Television series by Disney